The 1912 Colorado Agricultural Aggies football team represented Colorado Agricultural College (now known as Colorado State University) in the Rocky Mountain Conference (RMC) during the 1912 college football season.  In their second season under head coach Harry W. Hughes, the Aggies compiled a 3–2 record, tied for third in the RMC, and outscored opponents by a total of 68 to 40.

Schedule

References

Colorado Agricultural
Colorado State Rams football seasons
Colorado Agricultural Aggies football